Ramzan Mezhidov (1967–1999), was a freelance Chechen cameraman. On October 29, 1999, together with Shamil Gigayev, a cameraman for independent Nokh Cho television station in Grozny, he was killed during a Russian air strike on refugees fleeing Chechnya.

Before working for Moscow-based Centre TV, Mezhidov had worked as a freelance for the German ARD between the Chechen conflicts. During the First Chechen War, Mezhidov had been a valuable asset to the Centre TV throughout the Northern Caucasus, particularly in the Republic of Dagestan.

On October 29, 1999, together with other journalists he was covering a large refugee convoy  from Grozny to Nazran in neighboring Ingushetia en route along the Baku-Rostov highway. As the convoy approached the Chechen town of Shami-Yurt, a Russian fighter bomber fired several air-to-ground missiles, hitting a busload of refugees. Despite warnings from colleagues traveling with them, Mezhidov and Gigayev left their vehicle to film the carnage. As they approached the bus, another Russian rocket hit a nearby truck, fatally wounding both journalists. The Russian air force pilot reportedly saw Mezhidov with a television camera on the aircraft's second run and fired at him. It is unclear whether the pilot believed his camera to be a weapon or was trying to prevent him from filming. Mezhidov was not killed immediately but mortally wounded and left on the road. He was eventually taken to hospital in Urus-Martan where he died from shock and blood loss.

References

1967 births
1999 deaths
Chechen journalists
Journalists killed while covering the Chechen wars
Russian people of Chechen descent
War photographers
Chechen people